Bass Lake is a lake in the U.S. state of Michigan. Located in Grand Traverse County, Bass Lake is part of the Boardman River and Grand Traverse Bay watersheds. While primarily in Long Lake Township, some of the lake extends south into Green Lake Township. 

On the southwestern shore of Bass Lake lies Camp Carvela, a residential summer camp.

See also 

 List of lakes in Michigan

References 

Lakes of Michigan
Lakes of Grand Traverse County, Michigan